Sirra or  was an ancient Greek polis (after the 4th century BC) located in Thrace, in the region between the river Strymon and the river Nestos. Sirra was located in the territory of the Odomantes.

It was founded by Paeonians, expanded by Macedonian kings with immigrants and extended to compromise a vast territory with its Komai. Sirra had participated in a local Pentapolis and perhaps in the earlier sympoliteia. It was the northern limit along with Daneiros of the territory granted to another polis, Philippi by Philip II. Sirra's name has remained relatively unchanged since antiquity, in Serres, Serrai. Sirra was located inland.

The precise location and positive of Ancient Sirra is on the Koulas hill north of the modern city with sparse remains.

See also 
Greek colonies in Thrace

References 

 
Archaeological sites in Macedonia (Greece)
Ancient Greek archaeological sites in Greece
Greek colonies in Thrace
Populated places in ancient Thrace
Former populated places in Greece